Prince Luitpold of Bavaria (German: Luitpold Prinz von Bayern; born 14 April 1951) is a member and second in line of succession to the headship of the House of Wittelsbach, which reigned as Kings of Bavaria until 1918, and a CEO of König Ludwig GmbH & Co. KG Schlossbrauerei Kaltenberg.

Early life
Prince Luitpold was born at Schloß Leutstetten near Starnberg, in Bavaria. He is the only surviving child of Prince Ludwig of Bavaria (1913–2008) and his wife Princess Irmingard of Bavaria (1923–2010).

Marriage
On 25 June 1979, Prince Luitpold married Katrin Beatrix Wiegand (born 19 September 1951 in Munich), daughter of Gerd Wiegand (1922 in Cottbus – 1994 in Munich), architect, and first wife Ellen Schumacher, who married secondly Frauke Sinjen (1940/41 – 4 July 2003), actress. The civil wedding took place at Starnberg and the religious ceremony followed a day later at the Andechs Abbey in Bavaria. Initially the union was considered morganatic, but on 3 March 1999, the marriage was declared to be dynastic on the condition their children contracted dynastic marriages. The couple had five children and five grandchildren:
 Princess Auguste Marie Philippa (born 11 October 1979 in Landsberg am Lech), a research zoologist working under the name Auguste M.P. von Bayern who investigates animal cognition as a collaborator of Alex Kacelnik. She married in a civil marriage on 26 December 2009 in Bourail, New Caledonia, Prince Ferdinand of Lippe-Weissenfeld (born 5 September 1976 in Detmold), son of Prince Ferdinand of Lippe-Weissenfeld and Baroness Karoline von Feilitzsch. The religious ceremony took place on 5 June 2010 at Andechs Abbey. They have three sons:
 Prince Louis-Ferdinand of Lippe-Weissenfeld (born 16 September 2013)
 Prince Carl-Philipp of Lippe-Weissenfeld (born 22 December 2015 in Starnberg)
 Prince Otto Heinrich of Lippe-Weissenfeld (born 24 March 2018 in Starnberg)
 Princess Alice Isabella Maria (born 25 June 1981 in Landsberg am Lech), a cognitive biology researcher and manager of the University of Vienna's Goffin Lab working under the name Alice Auersperg. She married on 29 August 2009, Prince Lukas of Auersperg (born 27 August 1981 in St. Pölten), son of Prince Andreas of Auersperg and Julia Rosemary Griffith. They have two children:
 Princess Olivia of Auersperg (born 13 April 2013)
 Prince Ludwig of Auersperg (born 8 April 2015)
 Prince Ludwig Heinrich of Bavaria (born 14 June 1982 in Landsberg am Lech), studied political science and law, following which his uncle Franz, Duke of Bavaria, called him to Nymphenburg Palace to be trained in the former Royal Family's estate management. He also became chairman of Hilfsverein Nymphenburg, a charitable organization founded in 1964 by the royal family and the Bavarian Red Cross, with activities in development aid. He then founded Learning Lions, a schooling project in Kenya, where he spent most of the year. In August 2022, his engagement to Sophie-Alexandra Evekink, a dual Dutch/Canadian citizen and doctoral student at the Law Faculty of the University of Oxford, was announced.
 Prince Heinrich Rudolf of Bavaria (born 23 January 1986 in Landsberg am Lech), married on 22 April 2017 at Andechs Abbey, Henriette Gruse (born 26 December 1982), daughter of Bernd Gruse and Friederike Gruse
 Prince Maximilian of Bavaria (born 2021) 
 Prince Karl Rupprecht of Bavaria (born 10 March 1987)

Because the current head and the heir-presumptive of the Royal House of Bavaria, Duke Franz and his younger brother Max, have no male offspring, their first cousin (and second cousin in the male line) Luitpold and his son Prince Ludwig are next in line to inherit representation of the House of Bavaria's historically royal legacy.

Business activities
Prince Luitpold is the proprietor and CEO of a brewery located at Kaltenberg Castle (König Ludwig GmbH & Co. KG Schlossbrauerei Kaltenberg) which was founded in 1871, and largely extended by the prince who also purchased Marthabräu brewery at Fürstenfeldbruck in 1980, where his wheat beer is produced. At Kaltenberg he also organizes an annual jousting tournament.

In 2011 he purchased the Nymphenburg Porcelain Manufactory, founded in 1745 by Maximilian III Joseph, Prince-Elector of Bavaria.

Prince Luitpold owns the Bavarian castles of Leutstetten and Kaltenberg, in which he lives with his family.

Ancestry

References

 Die Wittelsbacher. Geschichte unserer Familie. Adalbert, Prinz von Bayern. Prestel Verlag, München, 1979

House of Wittelsbach
1951 births
Living people
People from Starnberg
Recipients of the Cross of the Order of Merit of the Federal Republic of Germany